Chris Baker may refer to 

Chris Baker (artist) (born 1960), British science fiction artist
Chris Baker (defensive lineman) (born 1987), American football defensive lineman
Chris Baker (golfer) (born 1986), American professional golfer
Chris Baker (high jumper) (born 1991), British high jumper
Chris Baker (politician) (born 1958), Australian politician
Chris Baker (racing driver) (born 1969), American race car driver
Chris Baker (talk radio host), American comedian and radio talk show host
Chris Baker (tight end) (born 1979), former American football tight end
Chris Baker (writer) (born 1948), Thailand-based British writer

See also
Christopher Baker (disambiguation)
Chris Barker (disambiguation)